Marc Baget (born 5 September 1984 in Tournay) is a French professional rugby union player.

As a Number eight, Avril played for Biarritz Olympique where which he won two Top 14 titles. In 2008 he left Biarritz to play for Aviron Bayonnais where he became captain.

External links 

French rugby union players
1984 births
Living people
Rugby union number eights
Sportspeople from Hautes-Pyrénées
Aviron Bayonnais players
Biarritz Olympique players
AS Béziers Hérault players
SU Agen Lot-et-Garonne players